Tryptophanyl-tRNA synthetase, mitochondrial is an enzyme that in humans is encoded by the WARS2 gene.

Function 

Aminoacyl-tRNA synthetases catalyze the aminoacylation of tRNA by their cognate amino acid. Because of their central role in linking amino acids with nucleotide triplets contained in tRNAs, aminoacyl-tRNA synthetases are thought to be among the first proteins that appeared in evolution. Two forms of tryptophanyl-tRNA synthetase exist, a cytoplasmic form, named WARS, and a mitochondrial form, named WARS2. This gene encodes the mitochondrial tryptophanyl-tRNA synthetase. Two alternative transcripts encoding different isoforms have been described.

References

Further reading

External links